Simon Bartram is an English illustrator and writer of children's picture books. He was one runner-up for the Mother Goose Award in 1999 for Pinocchio and for the Kate Greenaway Medal in 2002 for Man on the Moon: A Day in the Life of Bob. In 2004 Man on the Moon was voted "best illustrated book to read aloud" by a panel of Blue Peter viewers and also named Blue Peter Book Awards Book of the Year.

References

External links
 
 
 

English children's book illustrators
English children's writers
English illustrators
Living people
Year of birth missing (living people)
Place of birth missing (living people)